Artificial gills may refer to:

Imitation gills put into stuffed fish for the sake of appearance in taxidermy
An inaccurate term for liquid breathing sets
Artificial gills (human), which extract oxygen from water to supply a human diver